Şefika Kutluer (born 5 May 1961) is a Turkish female classical flautist.

She was born in Ankara, Turkey. While still in the primary school, she transferred to the primary school section of Ankara State Conservatory upon the suggestion of Ulvi Cemal Erkin, a notable musician and a friend of her father. In the conservatory, she specialized on flute, and graduated in 1979 with high honors. In 1983, she married businessman Ahmet Refik Kutluer.

Music career
She achieved her soloist career in Vienna, Austria and Rome, Italy. She has performed in concerts at the Palace of Nations in Geneva, Switzerland on the occasion of the 60th Anniversary of the United Nations Organization, at the Palace of Spain in the presence of the King and the Queen, and in Tokyo, Japan under the auspices of Prince Mikasa. She has a large repertoire extending from the Baroque period to the Romantic period and from mystical music to cross-over works from the East and West. The daily The New York Times named her "Magic Flute".

Currently, Kutluer is the flute soloist of the İzmir State Symphony Orchestra.

Awards
She was awarded the Presidential Medal of Turkey in 1985. On 22 August 1991, she was officially appointed as State Artist of Turkey. She has received  the "Strategic Vision Award” from  “Turkish Asian Center for Strategic Studies (TASAM)", in 2013.

She was also awarded abroad; like the "2000 Inter-Lyra Award" by Hungarian Foundation for Performing Arts . She is decorated abroad such as  "Cavaliere dell’Ordine della Stella della Solidarieta’ Italiana" by the President of Italy, with "Austrian Gold Medal of Merit" by the President of Austria, the "Cultural Medal of the Republic of Kazakhstan".

In 2011, she has been appointed as the ". Goodwill Ambassador of Unicef".

References

Living people
1961 births
Musicians from Ankara
Turkish women
Hacettepe University Ankara State Conservatory alumni
Turkish classical flautists
Women flautists
State Artists of Turkey